Aubrey Lyle Dunn Sr. (March 25, 1928 – August 23, 2012), was an American politician and businessman who served as a member of the New Mexico Senate from 1965 to 1980.

Early life 
He was born in Alamogordo, New Mexico.

Career 
Elected to the New Mexico Senate in 1964, he assumed office in 1965. During his tenure, Dunn was the chair of the New Mexico Senate Finance Committee. He was also partial owner of the Alamogordo Daily News.

Personal life 
Dunn had three children. His son, Aubrey Dunn Jr., is a businessman and politician who served as the New Mexico Commissioner of Public Lands from 2015 to 2018.

References

2012 deaths
Democratic Party New Mexico state senators
1928 births
People from Alamogordo, New Mexico